{{Infobox Christian leader
| type = cardinal
| honorific-prefix = His Eminence and Lordship
| name = Soane Patita Paini Mafi
| title = CardinalBishop of Tonga
| image = Soane Patita Paini Mafi.jpg
| alt = 
| caption = The cardinal in Rome on 23 October 2015.
| church = Roman Catholic Church
| archdiocese = 
| diocese = Tonga
| see = Tonga
| appointed = 18 April 2008
| term_start = 21 April 2008
| predecessor = Soane Lilo Foliaki
| successor = 
| other_post = Cardinal-Priest of Santa Paola Romana (2015-)
| ordination = 29 June 1991
| ordained_by = Patelisio Punou-Ki-Hihifo Finau
| consecration = 4 October 2007
| consecrated_by = Soane Lilo Foliaki
| cardinal = 14 February 2015
| created_cardinal_by = Pope Francis
| rank = Cardinal-Priest
| birth_name = Soane Patita Paini Mafi
| birth_date = 
| birth_place = Nukuʻalofa, Tonga
| death_date = 
| death_place = 
| previous_post = 
| motto = "Ke Loloto e Tui"("Deepen The Faith")
| coat_of_arms = Coat of arms of Soane Patita Paini Mafi.svg
}}

Soane Patita Paini Mafi (born 19 December 1961) is the fourth Roman Catholic Bishop of Tonga. At the age of 53, on 14 February 2015, he was appointed by Pope Francis as the first ever cardinal from Tonga and he became on that date the youngest member of the College of Cardinals with the title of cardinal priest assigned to the titular church of Santa Paola Romana.

Early life
Mafi was born into a strongly Catholic family. His father and grandfather were catechists. He grew up in Tonga and, as a young man, joined a youth group at his parish in Kolofo'ou near the capital Nuku'alofa on the main island of Tongatapu. He studied for the priesthood at the Pacific Regional Seminary in Suva, Fiji. He was ordained a priest in 1991 at the age of 29.

 Priesthood 
He then spent four years in parish work on  the Tongan island of Ha'apai. In 1995 Bishop Foliaki appointed him Vicar-General of the diocese at the age of 34. He was only 5 years ordained.
 
He spent three years studying religious education at Loyola University, Baltimore, Maryland, graduating in 2000. He was then stationed for six years in Suva (Fiji), engaged in the formation training of local priests.

Bishop
Mafi was appointed coadjutor bishop of Tonga in June 2007 and was consecrated bishop in that year. When he succeeded Bishop Soane Lilo Foliaki as Bishop of Tonga on 18 April 2008, he became the first diocesan priest to be bishop of the diocese of Tonga.  His three predecessors were members of the Society of Mary. He participated in the Third Extraordinary General Assembly of the Synod of Bishops on the Pastoral Challenges of the Family in the Context of Evangelization held on October 5–19, 2014. Mafi has been president of the Episcopal Conference of the Pacific since 2010. 

Cardinal
On 14 February 2015, Pope Francis appointed Mafi a cardinal with the title of Cardinal-Priest of Santa Paola Romana''. On 13 April 2015, he was appointed a member of the Congregation for the Evangelization of Peoples and of the Pontifical Council Cor Unum for Human and Christian Development.

Honours and awards 
National honours
  Order of Queen Sālote Tupou III, Commander (31 July 2008).

Nongovernmental organizations
  Slovakia,  Servare et Manere: Friend of Peace, honorable recognition.

See also

Cardinals created by Francis
Roman Catholicism in Tonga

References

External links

 

1961 births
21st-century Roman Catholic bishops in Tonga
Tongan cardinals
Cardinals created by Pope Francis
Living people
Members of the Congregation for the Evangelization of Peoples
People from Nukuʻalofa
Roman Catholic bishops of Tonga
Knight Commanders of the Order of Queen Sālote Tupou III
Tongan Roman Catholic bishops